A patio home or cluster home is an American house in a suburban setting. It can be a small, freestanding structure very close to the neighbor or part of a unit of several houses attached to each other, typically with shared walls between units, and with exterior maintenance and landscaping provided through an association fee. Not all of these elements are present in all buildings called patio homes, as the term is used somewhat generically by the real estate industry.

The building may actually be a condo in which the owner holds a fractional interest in the land throughout the development, or it may be titled as a townhome in which each homeowner holds direct title to the land on which their unit is built. Targeted buyers are primarily those who do not want to be bothered by external maintenance typically associated with home ownership, sometimes because they only live in the patio home for part of the year.

There is not usually a legal definition of a patio home, and some houses called patio homes may alternatively be marketed as townhouses, garden homes, twin homes, or carriage homes. Most taxing jurisdictions do not have a separate classification for patio homes.

The term was first seen in print in the mid-1970s. In a more generic sense it may refer to a home with a prominent patio, such as some traditional Mediterranean-style homes.

See also

 Duplex (building)

References

House styles